Samantha Baggett Bohon (born Samantha Lea Baggett; born June 7, 1976) is an American soccer head coach for the Florida Gators women's soccer team and retired player who was a member of the United States women's national soccer team.

Personal life
Bohon was born in Fort Lauderdale, Florida, and grew up in Daytona Beach where she attended Seabreeze High School. She earned her bachelor's degree from Duke University in 1998 with a double major in English and sociology, and received an M.A. in sport administration from the University of North Carolina at Chapel Hill in 2001.

International career statistics

References

External links
 Duke player profile
 Embry-Riddle coaching profile

1976 births
Living people
Sportspeople from Fort Lauderdale, Florida
Soccer players from Florida
American women's soccer players
United States women's international soccer players
Duke Blue Devils women's soccer players
Women's association football defenders
Raleigh Wings players
USL W-League (1995–2015) players
University of North Carolina at Chapel Hill alumni